Bus Stop is a 2012 Indian Telugu-language romantic drama film directed by Maruthi, starring Prince Cecil and Sri Divya. The film was produced was by Bellamkonda Suresh  and J.B. produced the music. The movie was planned for release on 9 November 2012, but was released on 11 November 2012 due to issues with the Indian censor board. The film was a commercial success.

Plot

Cast
 Prince as Seenu
 Sri Divya as Shailaja
 Sai Kumar Pampana as Muthu
 Khanna as Khanna
 Anandhi as Seema
 Abhi
 Gopal Sai
 Rao Ramesh
 Koteswara Rao

Release
The movie's producer Bellamkonda Suresh announced that the film will be released across the state on 11 November 2012. But earlier on 10 November, he told the media that a few multiplexes will begin screening the film from today itself and the bookings for the evenings shows of Bus Stop are expected to open shortly.

Reception

Critical reception 
123Telugu gave a review stating "If you liked 'Ee Rojullo', you will like 'Bus Stop'. The film is an entertaining youth comedy with a nice message in the end. The good emotional quotient in the second half will strike a chord with parents as well as students. Some may find the vulgarity in the film a little uncomfortable, but hey, this is an A rated comedy. So you should know what you are going to watch." Rediff.com gave a review stating "Bus Stop is an urban take on what love means to different people just time-pass or a commitment or just fun. Whatever it is, the urban youth could connect with Bus Stop."

Box office 
Bus Stop was made with a budget of just  and had no stars. But the film had a collection of  statewide with an aggregate of 4.4 million in Nizam Area itself. It had a good start in A centers and above average start in B&C Centers and was declared a "Hit" within one week of its release. The film completed a successful 50 day run on 30 December 2012.

Soundtrack

Bus Stop movie audio release function was held on 14 October 2012 at Shilpakala Vedika in Hyderabad. Prince, Sri Divya, Sunil, Samantha, M. M. Keeravani, Nandini Reddy, Bellamkonda Suresh, Sunil and Naga Sudhir Babu graced the event. Jeevan Babu and Anil R. composed the music. It marked Babu's second collaboration with Maruthi, after Ee Rojullo. The audio got good response from the public.

References

2012 films
2010s Telugu-language films
Films directed by Maruthi
2012 romantic comedy films
2012 romantic drama films
Indian romantic drama films
Films shot in Hyderabad, India
Films set in Hyderabad, India